The Marshall Thundering Herd is the intercollegiate athletic collection of teams that collectively represent the Marshall University in Huntington, West Virginia. Thundering Herd athletic teams compete in the Sun Belt Conference, which are members of the NCAA Division I. The school's official colors are kelly green and white. The Marshall Thundering Herd have won 3 NCAA national championships and one NAIA national championship.

Sports sponsored

Baseball 

 Head Coach: Greg Beals
 Stadium: Kennedy Center Field
 Conference Championships: 9 (1928, 1929, 1930, 1931, 1933, 1934, 1935, 1978, 1981)
 NCAA Tournament Appearances: 2 (1973, 1978)
 First Season Played: 1896

Early Marshall baseball teams played on what is now Buskirk Field on campus, but has long since been handicapped by a lack of on-campus facilities. Currently, the program uses Kennedy Center Field for home games in Huntington, Appalachian Power Park in Charleston (home of the West Virginia Power). A new on-campus facility is currently being planned to open in 2024.

Basketball

Men's basketball 

 Head Coach: Dan D'Antoni
 Arena: Cam Henderson Center
 Conference Championships: 11 - (Regular Season: 1937, 1938, 1939, 1956, 1984, 1987, 1988; Tournament: 1984, 1985, 1987, 2018)
 NCAA Tournament Appearances: 6 (1956, 1972, 1984, 1985, 1987, 2018)
 NIT Tournament Appearances: 5 (1967, 1968, 1973, 1988, 2012)
 NAIA National Championship: 1 (1947)
 All-Americans: 4
 Best Final Ranking: No. 12 (1972 Associated Press)
 First Season Played: 1907

Marshall men's basketball gained notoriety under Cam Henderson, inventor of the fast break and the 2-3 zone defense who coached the team from 1935 to 1955.  As head coach of the Herd men's basketball team, Henderson compiled a record of 362-159 and won the 1947 NAIA National Championship. His Marshall teams produced 2 All-Americans, Jule Rivlin and Andy Tonkovich - the latter was selected as the #1 overall pick in the 1948 NBA draft. Henderson also recruited the first African-American to play at the formerly all-white colleges of West Virginia when he signed Hal Greer in 1954. His 1947 championship basketball team spurred the move into the Veterans Memorial Fieldhouse, a 6,500-seat arena that was Marshall's basketball home from 1950 to 1980. The Fieldhouse was replaced in 1981 with the Cam Henderson Center named in his honor.

Women's basketball 

 Head Coach: Tony Kemper
 Arena: Cam Henderson Center
 Conference Championships: 7 - (Regular Season: 1985, 1986, 1987, 1988, 1989; Tournament: 1976, 1997)
 NCAA Tournament Appearances: 1 (1997)
 Postseason Invitational Tournament Appearances: 4 (1971, 2015, 2016, 2019)
 All-Americans: 1
 First Season Played: 1969

Football 

 Head Coach: Charles Huff
 Stadium: Joan C. Edwards Stadium
 Conference Championships: 13 - (1925, 1928, 1931, 1937, 1988, 1994, 1996, 1997, 1998, 1999, 2000, 2002, 2014)
 Post-Season Bowl Appearances: 19 (1947, 1997, 1998, 1999, 2000, 2001, 2002, 2004, 2009, 2011, 2013, 2014, 2015, 2017, 2018, 2019, 2020, 2021, 2022)
 NCAA Division I FCS National Championships: 2 (1992, 1996)
 Best Final Ranking: FBS No. 10 (1999 Associated Press, 1999 Coaches' Poll) / FCS No. 1 (1996 Sports Network)
 First Season Played: 1895

Historically, the Herd played on Central Field through 1928, at Fairfield Stadium from 1928 until 1990, and at Joan C. Edwards Stadium since 1991.

On November 14, 1970, Southern Airways Flight 932 crashed near Kenova, West Virginia and killed all 75 passengers on board, including 37 members of the Thundering Herd football team.  The plane disaster and rebuilding of the program was the subject of the documentary Marshall University: Ashes to Glory, and these events were depicted in the 2006 Warner Brothers motion picture, We Are Marshall, starring Matthew McConaughey and Matthew Fox.

Golf

Men's golf
Men's Golf
 Head Coach: Matt Grobe
 Home Course: Guyan Golf and Country Club
 Conference Team Championships: 2 (1962, 1966) 
 Conference Individual Champions: 10
 NCAA Tournament Team Appearances: 5 (1955, 1957, 1962, 1976, 1993)
 NCAA Tournament Individual Appearances: 11
 All-Americans: 1
 Best Final Ranking: 11th (1962 NCAA Golf Championships)
 First Season Played: 1949

Since its inception in 1968, the Marshall Invitational held at the Guyan Golf and Country Club has become one of the top collegiate golf tournaments in the Eastern United States. It had been held annually in April until being moved to September in 2010. It was renamed the Joe Feaganes Marshall Invitational in 2013 in honor of the Herd's longtime coach who led the program from 1972 to 2012.

Women's golf
 Head Coach: Brooke Burkhammer
 Home Course: Guyan Golf and Country Club
 AIWA Tournament Appearances: 1 (1981)
 First Season Played: 1974–1983, restarted 2002

Marshall initially fielded a women's golf team from 1974 to 1983 and competed in the Association for Intercollegiate Athletics for Women championships. The program relaunched in 2002 competing in the NCAA.

Soccer

Men's soccer 

 Head Coach: Chris Grassie
 Stadium: Veterans Memorial Soccer Complex
 National Championships: 1 (2020)
 Conference Championships: 4 - (Regular Season: 2000, 2019, 2020; Tournament: 2019)
 NCAA Tournament Appearances: 4 (2019, 2020, 2021, 2022)
 All-Americans: 4
 Best Final Ranking: No. 1 (2020 United Soccer Coaches, Top Drawer Soccer, College Soccer News)
 First Season Played: 1979

The team plays its home games at Veterans Memorial Soccer Complex in Huntington. The Thundering Herd have made 4 straight NCAA Tournament appearances 2019-2022, including winning the national championship in the 2020 NCAA Division I Men's Soccer Tournament.

Women's soccer 

 Head Coach: Michael Swan
 Stadium: Veterans Memorial Soccer Complex
 First Season Played: 1998

Softball 

 Head Coach: Megan Smith
 Stadium: Dot Hicks Field
 Conference Championships: 5 - (Regular Season: 2003, 2005, 2017; Tournament: 1995, 2013)
 NCAA Tournament Appearances: 2 (2013, 2017)
 All-Americans: 4
 Best Final Ranking: No. 24 (2017 USA Today/NFCA Coaches Poll)
 First Season Played: 1994

Tennis 
 Head Coach: John Mercer
 NCAA Tournament Team Appearances: 4 (2002, 2003, 2004, 2005)
 NCAA Tournament Doubles Appearances: 6 (2003, 2004, 2006, 2008, 2010, 2011)
 NCAA Tournament Individual Appearances: 4
 Conference Team Championships: 12 (Regular Season 1971, 1976, 1977, 1997, 2000, 2003, 2004; Tournament 1997, 2002, 2003, 2004, 2005)
 All-Americans: 2
 First Season Played: 1970

Volleyball 
 Head Coach: Ari Aganus
 Arena: Cam Henderson Center
 Conference Championships: 6 - (Regular Season: 1996, 2005, 2007 Tournament: 1988, 1995, 2005)
 NCAA Tournament Appearances: 2 (1995, 2005)
 First Season Played: 1970

Cross Country 

 Head Coach: Caleb Bowen
 NCAA Tournament qualifiers: 2 - (Kim Nutter 1979, Matt Schiffbauer)

Track and Field 

 Head Coach: Jeff Smalls
 Cross Country Coach: Caleb Bowen
 Facility: Chris Cline Athletic Complex

Swimming and Diving 

 Head Coach: Ian Walsh
 Diving Coach: Megan Siford
 Facility: Frederick A. Fitch Nataorium

Traditions

Mascot 

Initially, Marshall athletic teams used the nickname "Big Green" for much of its early history. However, Huntington sportswriter Duke Ridgley first used the phrase "Thundering Herd" in 1925 to describe the football team. The headlines of that football season, coupled with the popularity of Zane Grey's novel at the time, "The Thundering Herd", saw the nickname stick.

As early as the 1930s, buffalo mascots appearances on the sideline of Marshall sporting events.  However, the mascot would remain nameless and sporadic in appearances until 1954, when the editors of the Marshall University yearbook created a buffalo character roaming through the pages and named their character "Marco", derived from the term "Marshall College" as the school was known at the time. A buffalo costume was purchased for a booster club in 1965, and Marco would return to sporting events that year. In 1970, a live buffalo was introduced as Marco the mascot and was trained to perform at halftime for football games. However, after halftime during a game against Xavier in 1971, the live buffalo refused to return to its trailer and kickoff of the second half was delayed as handlers attempted to control the buffalo.  The live mascot performances were discontinued afterward.

School songs 
Marshall school songs are typically performed by the Marshall University Marching Thunder at home sporting events.

"Sons of Marshall" 
Marshall University's fight song is "Sons of Marshall", referring to the students of the institution, and was written by Marshall alum Ralph A. Williams in 1935.

Alma Mater 
The Marshall University Alma Mater was written in 1906 by C.E. and James Haworth

Championships

NCAA team championships

Marshall University has won 3 NCAA team national championships.
Men's (3):
Football (I-AA) (2): 1992, 1996
 Soccer (1): 2020

Other national team championships
Below are national team titles in current and former NCAA sports that were not bestowed by the NCAA:

Men's (1):
Basketball (1): 1947

Rivalries

Marshall's biggest rivalries are out of conference with Ohio University, East Carolina University, and West Virginia University. In the Sun Belt Conference, Marshall has a budding rivalry with Appalachian State University,

Facilities

Joan C. Edwards Stadium

Marshall plays football at Joan C. Edwards Stadium, which seats 38,019. The stadium, which opened for the 1991 season as Marshall University Stadium with a then-record crowd of 33,116 for a 24–23 win over New Hampshire, hosted a record crowd of 41,382 on September 10, 2010, when the Thundering Herd played the in-state rival West Virginia Mountaineers. On a façade on the stadium's west side is a bronze memorial dedicated to the 1970 plane-crash victims.

In 2003, Marshall renamed its stadium, honoring a major donor, Joan C. Edwards to the university and its athletic program. The facility became the first football stadium in Division I-A to be named after a woman; Mrs. Edwards' husband, James F. Edwards, has his name on the actual playing field.

Cam Henderson Center

Men's basketball, women's basketball, and volleyball teams play their home games at the 9,048-seat Cam Henderson Center, named for the innovative Cam Henderson who guided the school's basketball team from 1935 to 1955 and football from 1935 to 1949. Henderson won 358 games against just 158 losses as a basketball coach. The facility opened in 1981 and saw a major renovation in 1998. The Henderson Center is a 213,000 square-foot facility which houses much of Marshall University's athletic department staff offices, the ticket office, an 800-seat natatorium, a state of the art training room, a basketball-specific weight room, and spacious locker rooms. The single game attendance record at the Cam Henderson Center was set on February 18, 1984, against The Citadel when 10,705 fans witnessed the 85-71 Marshall victory.

Veterans Memorial Soccer Complex

Hoops Family Field at Veterans Memorial Soccer Complex is a 1,006-capacity soccer-specific stadium and is home to the Herd's men's and women's soccer teams. It was built on the former site of the Veterans Memorial Fieldhouse, which was demolished in order to build the stadium at a cost of $8 million. An inaugural double-header took place on August 23, 2013. The men's team held a scrimmage against Marshall alumni from past years resulting in a 2–0 victory. The women's team faced the Campbell University Fighting Camels and won 3–0.  The largest crowd in the stadium's history occurred on September 17, 2021, when 3,033 witnessed Marshall and West Virginia draw, 2–2.

Chris Cline Indoor Athletic Facility

In 2012, Marshall University announced a multi-facility expansion project known as the Herd Vision campaign. The university accepted ownership of the Veterans Memorial Fieldhouse located five blocks from campus, which was demolished and replaced by the Veterans Memorial Soccer Complex, a soccer specific stadium which opened in August 2013.  MU's former soccer facility next to Joan C. Edwards Stadium, Sam Hood Field, was replaced by the Chris Cline Indoor Athletic Facility, a $25 million project which included an indoor football practice facility, an indoor track, the Marshall University Athletic Hall of Fame, and a physical therapy research center, known as the Marshall Sports Medicine Institute, available for both student-athletes and anyone from inside or outside of MU who needs help with sports medicine or work related rehab or training.  The Chris Cline Indoor Athletic Facility opened in September 2014.  MU legends Chad Pennington, a former NFL quarterback with the New York Jets and Miami Dolphins, and the current head coach of the Houston Rockets of the NBA, Mike D'Antoni headed up fund raising for the effort for Marshall Director of Athletics Mike Hamrick.

Dot Hicks Field

The Marshall softball team has played its games at Dot Hicks Field since the facility opened in 2008. The $2.5 million facility features a clubhouse, grandstands, pressbox and concession building, warmup areas, and the playing field. The field is named after Dorothy "Dot" Hicks, a pioneer of the women's sports program at Marshall University who led the school's female student-athletics drom a time of intramural activities into the era of organized intercollegiate competition. At various times, she served as coach of Marshall's volleyball, badminton, women's tennis and women's golf teams.

Guyan Golf and Country Club 
The Guyan Golf and Country Club has served as the home course for Marshall's golf teams since the late 1940s. The Huntington course is 6,446 yards and a par-71. It has also served as the site of numerous tournaments throughout the years including the Marshall Invitational and Lady Herd Fall Classic. The golf pro of the course is Paul Bailey, a former Marshall University golfer.

Herd Rises
In October 2019, Marshall announced a $150 million fundraising initiative. The Herd Rises campaign aims to raise money for Marshall with the primary goal of building an on-campus baseball stadium at the site of the old Flint Group Pigments industrial property on 5th Avenue. Other goals of the campaign include improvements to Gullickson Hall, erecting a statue of legendary Marshall basketball player Hal Greer outside of the Cam Henderson Center, and additional funds towards student-athlete scholarships.

Future Baseball Stadium
In October 2022, Marshall officially broke ground on a new baseball stadium that will be constructed on 3rd Avenue and 22nd Street next to Dot Hicks softball field and across the street from Joan C. Edwards Stadium. West Virginia Governor Jim Justice donated $13.8 million towards the project with the City of Huntington and Marshall University also contributing nearly $10 million to help fund the stadium - projected to cost approximately $23 million overall. Completion is tentatively set for March 2024.

See also
List of college athletic programs in West Virginia

Notes

References

External links